This is a list of all bounded localities in Tasmania, Australia, as recognised by the Land Information System Tasmania. The definition of a locality for this list is an administrative area which uniquely defines the name of a place to enable street addressing, in metropolitan areas it may also be referred to as a ‘suburb’. Every locality has been defined with boundaries that do not overlap with other localities. A locality may include a town having the same name.

This list includes the postcode, local government area (LGA) and total area of each locality. If a locality spans more than one LGA, it is listed separately for each different LGA as well showing the partial area per LGA.

See also
List of Hobart suburbs
List of local government areas of Tasmania

References

Tasmania
Localities